Pyro-Magnetics Corporation was a Whitman, Massachusetts based manufacturer of industrial furnaces. The business produced a processor for disposing hazardous wastes. The product's technical requirements were approved by the Environmental Protection Agency in June 1982.

Insolvency

In late 1982 the corporation sold its two operating units to pay debts and after the sale few of its employees remained. The Pyro-Magnetics Corporation filed for Chapter 7 bankruptcy at a federal bankruptcy court in Whitman, in April 1983. Prior to this the firm embarked on an unsuccessful attempt to raise cash by developing commercial applications for its high-temperature melting technology. It failed to have enough funds to prepare and file an annual report with the Securities and Exchange Commission in the spring of 1983. The Pyro-Magnetics Corporation reported a loss of $71,093 in the first quarter of 1982 compared to an annual loss of $198,862 for the entire year of 1981.

References

Manufacturing companies disestablished in 1983
Companies that have filed for Chapter 7 bankruptcy
Defunct manufacturing companies based in Massachusetts
Waste management companies of the United States